Denis Murphy (June 20, 1870 – May 1, 1947) was a lawyer, judge and political figure in British Columbia. He represented Yale-West in the Legislative Assembly of British Columbia from 1900 to 1903.

He was born in Lac La Hache, British Columbia, the son of Denis Murphy and Helen White, and was educated at Ottawa University. Murphy was called to the British Columbia bar in 1896. He practised in Victoria for about a year and then moved to Ashcroft, where he practised until 1909. In 1900, he married Maude Cameron. He was named to the provincial cabinet as Provincial Secretary in November 1902 but resigned his cabinet post a few days later. Murphy was named to the Supreme Court of British Columbia in 1909; he retired from the bench in 1941. He also served on the board of governors for the University of British Columbia. In 1911, Murphy submitted a letter in the Vancouver Law Students' Annual under the name "Quill" in support of instituting formal legal education in the province. He died in Vancouver at the age of 76.

References 

1870 births
1949 deaths
Independent MLAs in British Columbia
Judges in British Columbia
Lawyers in British Columbia